Circular Quay Ferry Wharf is a complex of wharves at Circular Quay, on Sydney Cove, that serves as the hub for the Sydney Harbour ferry network.

Layout
The Circular Quay ferry wharf complex consists of five double-sided wharves at 90 degrees to the shoreline, numbered 2 to 6. Wharves 3 to 5 are used exclusively by Sydney Ferries, wharf 2 west is used by Sydney Ferries, wharf 2 east is used by Manly Fast Ferries by while wharf 6 is used by other operators including Captain Cook Cruises. Each wharf has ticket selling facilities on both sides of the barriers as most other wharves do not have such facilities.

On the eastern side alongside Bennelong Apartments, is the Eastern Pontoon used by charter operators. On the western side, lie the Commissioners Steps and Harbour Masters Steps that are used by charter operators and water taxis.

When the Port Jackson & Manly Steamship Company introduced hydrofoils to the Manly service in the mid-1960s, a pontoon was attached to the eastern side of wharf 2 to allow the hydrofoils to berth without their foils fouling the wharf. This was removed when the hydrofoils were replaced by JetCats in 1991.

Wharf 3 is exclusively used by ferries on the Manly service. When the Freshwater class ferries were introduced in the 1980s, the wharf was rebuilt to accommodate their onboard gangways. It has a mezzanine level allowing ferries to disembark passengers from their upper decks. It also houses an office for Transdev Sydney Ferries. To better accommodate the larger ferries, wharf 3 is built higher from the water and this combined with differently configured Opal card readers and gates, means only Manly ferries can use the wharf.

Wharves 2 West, 4 and 5 are used interchangeably by Sydney Ferries.

Ferry services

Interchanges

The Circular Quay ferry wharf complex is adjacent to an elevated railway station of the same name. The station is served by Sydney Trains services on the Airport & South Line, Inner West & Leppington Line and the Bankstown Line.

South of the railway station is the Alfred Street bus terminus. A number of Transdev John Holland routes originate from there while two Big Bus Tours routes depart from George Street just north of Alfred Street. There is also the terminus of the L2 and L3 Sydney Light Rail services, located west of the bus terminus, but still on Alfred Street.

References

External links

Circular Quay at Transport for New South Wales (Archived 10 June 2019)
Circular Quay Public Transport Map Transport for NSW

Ferry wharves in Sydney